The Goldene Stimmgabel (English: Golden Tuning Fork) was an annual prize awarded within the German music scene from 1981 to 2007.

The prizes were awarded according to the number of records sold from October of the previous year to June of the year of the award, as determined by Media Control. It was established in 1981 by Dieter Thomas Heck, who hosted the television gala award show every year since then. It was broadcast on either ARD or ZDF until the year 2000. From 2001 to 2007 the award show was broadcast by ZDF alone.

In 2008, ZDF decided not to present the award and did not announce whether they would be resumed later, discontinued, or replaced with another award. The award has not been held since (as of October 2019).

Winners 
 1981 Roy Black, Howard Carpendale, Bernd Clüver, Costa Cordalis, Jürgen Drews, Gitte Hænning, Michael Holm, Roland Kaiser, Jürgen Marcus, Paola, Chris Roberts, Ireen Sheer
 1982 Rex Gildo, Gitte Hænning, Karel Gott, Hanne Haller, Ted Herold, Andrea Jürgens, Roland Kaiser, Paola, Lena Valaitis, Nicole, Werner Böhm
 1983 Boney M., Andy Borg, Dschinghis Khan, Katja Ebstein, Gitte Hænning, Michael Holm, Andrea Jürgens, Roland Kaiser, Tony Marshall, Nicole, Paola, Frank Farian, Peter Schilling
 1984 Nino de Angelo, Roy Black, Howard Carpendale, Drafi Deutscher, Karel Gott, Nicki, Chris Roberts, Bert Kaempfert, Freddy Quinn, Udo Jürgens
 1985 Bläck Fööss, Bernd Clüver, Bata Illic, Jürgen Marcus, Paso Doble, Chris Roberts, Juliane Werding, Wind, Dieter Bohlen, Ralph Siegel, 
 1986 Howard Carpendale, Costa Cordalis, EAV, Udo Jürgens, Dietmar Kindler, Heinz Rudolf Kunze, Münchener Freiheit, Paola, Mireille Mathieu, Roger Whittaker, Stefanie & Kim
 1987 Howard Carpendale, Drafi Deutscher, Michael Hoffmann, Roland Kaiser, Münchener Freiheit, Nicki, Nicole, Juliane Werding, Teddy Parker, Thomas & Thomas
 1988 Nino de Angelo, Werner Buttstädt, Die Flippers, EAV, Ted Herold, Michael Holm, Hans-Joachim Müller Vondey, Nicki, Drafi Deutscher, Kurt Feltz, Caterina Valente, Frank Pavell
 1989 Roy Black, Tony Marshall, Merlin, Rainhard Fendrich, Gitte Hænning, Nicki, Hanne Haller, Vico Torriani, Klaus & Klaus, Franz Grothe
 1990 , Roy Black, Bata Illic, Peter Kraus, Münchener Freiheit, Milva, Nena, Nicole, Peter Richter, Matthias Reim, Naabtal Duo, Wildecker Herzbuben
 1991 Bernd Clüver, Nino de Angelo, Die Flippers, Heino, James Last, Manuela, Patrick Lindner, Tony Marshall, Matthias Reim, Juliane Werding, Wildecker Herzbuben, Michael Jary
 1992 G. G. Anderson, Udo Jürgens, René Kollo, Patrick Lindner, Manuela, Münchener Freiheit, Angelika Milster, Nicole, Matthias Reim, Jack White, Helmut Zacharias
 1993 G. G. Anderson, Bernhard Brink, Brunner & Brunner, Rex Gildo, Udo Lindenberg, Patrick Lindner, Peggy March, Nicole, Die Prinzen, Pur, Wiebke Schröder, Ireen Sheer, Juliane Werding, Bernd Meinunger, Robert Stolz
 1994 Tom Astor, Kristina Bach, Brunner & Brunner, Die Flippers, Rex Gildo, Ricky King, Lucilectric, Nena, Heike Neumeyer, Pur, Hans Bradte
 1995 Brunner & Brunner, Die Doofen, Die Flippers, Karel Gott, Susanne Grawe, Michael Holm, Claudia Jung, Ernst Mosch, Pur, Stefan Raab, Willi Seitz, Pe Werner, Rolf Zuckowski, Peter Kreuder
 1996 , Brunner & Brunner, Kastelruther Spatzen, Fool's Garden, Claudia Jung, Wencke Myhre, Nicole, Die Flippers, Wolfgang Petry, Pur, Freddy Quinn, Truck Stop, Gerhard Winkler
 1997 Blümchen, Hanne Haller, Kastelruther Spatzen, Stefanie Hertel, Claudia Jung, Patrick Lindner, Jonny Hill, Hansi Hinterseer, Wolfgang Petry, Michael Holm, Tic Tac Toe, Udo Lindenberg, Will Meisel
 1998 Brunner & Brunner, Die Paldauer, Die Flippers, Hansi Hinterseer, Truck Stop, Nicole, Stefanie Hertel, Guildo Horn & die Orthopädischen Strümpfe, Claudia Jung, Wolfgang Petry, Die Prinzen, Pur, André Rieu, Rosenstolz, Juliane Werding, Heino
 1999 , Brunner & Brunner, Die Flippers, Rex Gildo,  & , Hansi Hinterseer, Kastelruther Spatzen, Heinz Rudolf Kunze, Patrick Lindner, Tony Marshall, Michelle, Nicole, Oli.P, Wolfgang Petry, Schürzenjäger
 2000 Anton feat. DJ Ötzi, Brunner & Brunner, Die Flippers, Echt, Die Paldauer, Jantje Smit, Vicky Leandros, Nicole, Wolfgang Petry, Rosenstolz, James Last
 2001 Michelle, Wolfgang Petry, Helmut Lotti, Udo Jürgens, Hevia, Pur, Söhne Mannheims, Band Ohne Namen, Judith & Mel, Jantje Smit, Nicole, Rosenstolz, Brunner & Brunner
 2002 Andrea Berg, Wolfgang Petry, Xavier Naidoo, Nena, Die Flippers, Laith Al-Deen, E Nomine, Claudia Jung, Hansi Hinterseer, Brunner & Brunner, Jail Babes, Nena, Michael Kunze, Sylvester Levay
 2003 Andrea Berg, Wolfgang Petry, Hansi Hinterseer, Rosenstolz, Band ohne Namen, Die Flippers, Kastelruther Spatzen, André Rieu, Yvonne Catterfeld, Ben, 
 2004 Andrea Berg (female individual schlager), Matthias Reim (male individual schlager), Die Flippers (schlager group), Rosenstolz (duo German pop), De Randfichten (folk music), BAP (group German rock/progressive), MIA. (shooting star female group), Overground (shooting star male group),  (shooting star male individual), Pur (pop group), Brunner & Brunner (audience prize),  (young artists), Gitte Hænning, Wencke Myhre & Siw (special platinum prize)
 2005 Höhner (schlager group), Geschwister Hofmann (duo schlager), Andrea Berg (female individual schlager), Wolfgang Petry (male individual schlager), De Randfichten (folk music), Stefanie Hertel (female individual folk music), Hansi Hinterseer (male individual folk music), Söhne Mannheims (pop group), Ich + Ich (pop duo), 2raumwohnung (German pop duo), Annett Louisan (female individual pop), Max Mutzke (male individual pop), André Rieu (individual instrumental pop), Margot Eskens (Platinum Lifetime Award), Peter Maffay (Platinum Award)
 2006 Andrea Berg (female individual schlager), Semino Rossi (male individual schlager), Annett Louisan (female individual pop), Xavier Naidoo (male individual pop), Tokio Hotel (pop group and shooting star); Rosenstolz (pop duo), Hansi Hinterseer (male individual folk music), Monika Martin (female individual folk music), Christina Stürmer (female individual German pop), Erste Allgemeine Verunsicherung (German pop group), Götz Alsmann (individual jazz), Truck Stop (country group), Mamma Mia! (musical), Wolfgang Petry (Platinum Lifetime Award), Roger Whittaker (Platinum Lifetime Award)
 2007 Andrea Berg (female individual schlager), Roger Cicero (individual jazz), Hansi Hinterseer (individual folk music), Höhner (schlager group), Kastelruther Spatzen (folk music group), Heinz Rudolf Kunze (individual pop), LaFee (shooting star), Pur (German pop group), Semino Rossi (male individual schlager), Silbermond (pop group), Tokio Hotel (international rock group), Nana Mouskouri (Platinum Lifetime Award), Rolf Zuckowski (Platinum Lifetime Award)

References 

German music awards
Schlager
Awards established in 1981
Awards disestablished in 2007
Das Erste original programming
ZDF original programming